This is a list of buildings that are examples of the Art Deco architectural style in Georgia, United States.

Atlanta 
 7 Stages Theatre (former Little 5 Points Theatre), Atlanta, 1940
 Atlanta City Hall, Atlanta, 1930
 Cheshire Square Shopping Center, Atlanta, 1967
 Empire Manufacturing Company Building, Atlanta, 1939
 Evans Cucich House, Atlanta, 1935
 Forsyth Walton Building, Atlanta, 1936
 Freeman Ford Building, Atlanta, 1930
 GLG Grand, Atlanta, 1992
 Healey Building, Atlanta, 1920
 Lerner Shops, Atlanta
 Majestic Diner, Atlanta, 1929
 Martin Luther King, Jr. Federal Building, Atlanta, 1933
 Municipal Auditorium, Atlanta, 1909
 Nabisco Plant, Atlanta, 1955
 National NuGrape Company, Atlanta, 1937
 Olympia Building, Atlanta, 1936
 Plaza Theater, Atlanta, 1939
 Regenstein's, Atlanta
 Rhodes Haverty Building, Atlanta
 Southern Bell Telephone Company Building, Atlanta, 1929
 Southern Dairies, Atlanta, 1939
 Telephone Factory Lofts, Atlanta, 1938
 Ten Park Place, Atlanta, 1930
 Troy-Peerless Laundry Building, Atlanta, 1929
 United States Post Office, Federal Annex, Atlanta, 1933
 Variety Playhouse, Atlanta, 1940
 W. W. Orr Building, Atlanta, 1930
 William–Oliver Building, Atlanta, 1930

Gainesville 
 Dixie Hunt Hotel, Gainesville, 1937
 Logan Building, Gainesville, 1929
 Old Hall County Courthouse, Gainesville, 1937

Savannah 
 Globe Shoe Company, Savannah, 1929
 Karpf Building, Savannah
 The Savannah Theatre, Savannah, 1958

Tifton 
 Jenny's Fashion, Tifton Commercial Historic District, Tifton
 Lockeby Building, Tifton Commercial Historic District, Tifton, 1937
 Tift Theater, Tifton, 1937

Other cities 
 Albany Insurance Mart, Albany, 1950s
 Bacon Theatre, Alma, 1946
 Blackshear Bank Building, Blackshear, 1930s
 Blair Rutland Building, Decatur, 1925
 Campus Theatre, Milledgeville
 Coffee County Courthouse, Downtown Douglas Historic District, Douglas, 1940
 Colquitt Theater, Colquitt Town Square Historic District, Colquitt
 Colquitt Theater, Moultrie Commercial Historic District, Moultrie, 1941
 Dosta Theater, Valdosta, 1941
 Dublin Theatre, Dublin, 1934
 Earl Smith Strand Theater, Marietta, 1935
 Early County Jail, Blakely Court Square Historic District, Blakely, 1940
 Fickling Lodge No. 129, Butler, 1920
 Friedlander's Building, Moultrie, 1936
 Georgia Theater (now Emma Kelly Theater in the Averitt Center for the Arts), Statesboro, 1936
 Grand Theater, Fitzgerald, 1936
 Hogansville City Hall (former Royal Theater), Hogansville, 1937
 Holly Theatre, Dahlonega, 1948
 Liberty Theater, Columbus, 1925
 Martin Theatre (now Martin Centre), Downtown Douglas Historic District, Douglas, 1939
 Miller Theatre, Augusta, 1938
 Mitchell County Courthouse, Camilla Commercial Historic District, Camilla, mid-1930s
 Monroe City Hall, Monroe, 1939
 Montezuma Motor Company, Montezuma, 1920s
 Montgomery Ward Building, Griffin Commercial Historic District, Griffin, 1929
 Ocmulgee National Monument Visitor Center, Macon, 1936
 Pickens County Courthouse, Jasper, 1949
 Pine Theatre, Fitzgerald, 1945
 Playhouse Theater, Valdosta, 1941
 Ritz Theater, Thomaston, 1927
 Ritz Theatre at the Schaefer Center, Toccoa, 1939
 Royal Cafe, Quitman Historic District, Quitman, 1913
 Southeast Georgian Building, Kingsland Commercial Historic District, Kingsland, 1925
 Southern Trust Building, Macon, 1941
 State Theatre, Albany, 1945
 Strand Dinner Cinema, Jesup, 1920s
 Suwanee City Hall (Town Center), Suwanee, 2002
 Sylvia Theatre & Granitoid Office Building, Sylvania
 Tom Huston Frozen Foods Company–Montezuma Motor Company, Montezuma, 1920
 Troup County Courthouse, Annex, and Jail, LaGrange, 1939
 United States Post Office, Decatur, 1935
 Walker Theatre, Fort Gaines, 1936
 West Theatre, Cedartown, 1941
 Wink Theater, Dalton Commercial Historic District, Dalton, 1938
 Zebulon Theater, Cairo, 1936

See also 
 List of Art Deco architecture
 List of Art Deco architecture in the United States

References 

 "Art Deco & Streamline Moderne Buildings." Roadside Architecture.com. Retrieved 2019-01-03.
 Cinema Treasures. Retrieved 2022-09-06
 "Court House Lover". Flickr. Retrieved 2022-09-06
 "New Deal Map". The Living New Deal. Retrieved 2020-12-25.
 "SAH Archipedia". Society of Architectural Historians. Retrieved 2021-11-21.

External links 
 

 
Art Deco
Art Deco architecture in Georgia (U.S. state)
Georgia (U.S. state)-related lists